Entente Sportive Municipale de Gonfreville-l'Orcher is a French association football team founded in 1955. They are based in Gonfreville-l'Orcher, Seine-Maritime. Their home stadium is the Stade Maurice Baquet in the town. As of the 2022–23 season, they play in Championnat National 3, the fifth tier of French football, after winning promotion in 2022.

Gonfreville reached the 8th round of the 1991–92 Coupe de France.

References

Gonfreville
1955 establishments in France
Association football clubs established in 1955
Football clubs in Normandy
Sport in Seine-Maritime